The New England Patriots Radio Network is a radio network which carries live game broadcasts of the New England Patriots.  The network's flagship station is WBZ-FM Boston. Bob Socci, who now does the play-by-play with former Patriots quarterback Scott Zolak providing the color commentary and former Patriots linebacker Matt Chatham and WBZ-TV/WSBK-TV sports reporter Steve Burton providing the sideline reports.  Marc Bertrand and Boston Globe sports columnist Chris Gasper host the pregame, and the postgame show is hosted by Bertrand.  Albert Breer and Patriots Football Weekly writers Paul Perillo and Andy Hart are regular guest analysts on the network's pre-game show.
  
Gil Santos, former WBZ 1030 sports reporter who was known as the "Voice of the New England Patriots," retired after the 2012 season and was replaced by Bob Socci.  Santos called the Patriots' December win over the Dolphins that season.  Part of Santos' radio call was simulcast by CBS television in recognition of his time with the team.  Former hosts of the network's pre- and postgame show include Gary Tanguay, Andy Gresh, Bill Abbate, Mike Ruth, Tim Fox, Pete Brock, and Steve DeOssie.

Station list

Blue background indicates FM translator.
Gray background indicates station is a simulcast of another station.

See also
List of current NFL broadcasters

References

National Football League on the radio
Sports radio networks in the United States